José Andrés "Andy" Ruiz Rumph (born 30 May 1996) is a Guatemalan professional footballer who plays as a midfielder for Liga Nacional club  Municipal and the Guatemala national team.

Career
A product of FC Dallas' youth academy, Ruiz began his senior career with the reserve sides of Elversberg and Viktoria Köln in Germany. He returned to Guatemala with stints at Comunicaciones and Antigua, before signing with Cobán Imperial on 16 June 2020.

International career
Ruiz debuted with the Guatemala national team in a 0–0 friendly tie with El Salvador on 27 June 2021. He was called up to represent Guatemala at the 2021 CONCACAF Gold Cup, but had to withdraw after the first game as he contracted COVID-19.

References

External links
 
 

1996 births
Living people
Sportspeople from Guatemala City
Guatemalan footballers
Guatemala international footballers
Guatemala youth international footballers
Association football midfielders
Comunicaciones F.C. players
Antigua GFC players
Liga Nacional de Fútbol de Guatemala players
2021 CONCACAF Gold Cup players